Harold Scott Westerman (December 21, 1917 – December 29, 2011) was an American football and basketball coach and college athletic administrator. He served as the head football coach at the University of Maine from 1951 to 1966, compiling a record of 80–38–7 and winning four conference championships. Westerman was the head basketball coach at Hillsdale College from 1946 to 1949, tallying a mark of 18–36. He played college basketball for the University of Michigan.

Head coaching record

Football

References

External links
 

1917 births
2011 deaths
American men's basketball players
Basketball coaches from Michigan
Basketball players from Ann Arbor, Michigan
Hillsdale Chargers football coaches
Hillsdale Chargers men's basketball coaches
Maine Black Bears athletic directors
Maine Black Bears football coaches
Michigan Wolverines men's basketball players